Turkey Bowl may refer to one of the following sports events:

Turkey Bowl (high school), a common name for high school American football games held either on Thanksgiving or over Thanksgiving weekend
Turkey Bowl (amateur), nickname for informal backyard American football games held on Thanksgiving or over Thanksgiving weekend
Turkey bowling, a sport involving bowling with turkeys as bowling balls and soda bottles as pins
Impact Turkey Bowl, a special tournament that was aired on the Thanksgiving night episode of Impact!
Johns Hopkins Division of Cardiology jeopardy tournament between faculty and fellows, held the Wednesday morning before Thanksgiving since 2006